Neotephritis bruesi is a species of tephritid or fruit flies in the genus Neotephritis of the family Tephritidae.

Distribution
Jamaica.

References

Tephritinae
Insects described in 1933
Diptera of North America